The red-tailed black shark (Epalzeorhynchos bicolor; syn. Labeo bicolor), also known as the redtail shark and redtail sharkminnow, is a species of freshwater fish in the carp family, Cyprinidae. Despite its name, it is more closely related to carp. It is endemic to Thailand and currently critically endangered,  but common in aquaria, where it is prized for its deep black body and vivid red or vivid orange tail. The red-tailed black sharks seen in the aquarium trade today are all captive bred.

Distribution
The species is endemic to Thailand, and was described by Hugh M. Smith in 1931 as being 'not uncommon in Bueng Boraphet and the streams which lead from it, and as being found in the Chao Phraya River as far south as Bangkok. A 1934 expedition reported catching a specimen in the Silom canal. As of 2011 it is only known at a single location in the Chao Phraya basin and has Critically Endangered status on the IUCN Red List.  From 1996 until 2011 it was believed to be extinct in the wild.  There is no evidence that collection for the aquarium trade is responsible for the species' decline, and it is more likely that the construction of dams and draining of swamps that took place during the 1970s was to blame.

In the aquarium

In the aquarium trade, tail colors can vary, with bright red and vivid orange being the most common. If the shark is stressed or unhealthy, the red color will drain from its tail. Albino forms may also be encountered.

pH and water temperature
In home aquaria, redtail sharks prefer a pH between 6.8 and 7.5, a temperature between 22 °C and 26 °C (72 °F and 79 °F) and water hardness between 5 and 15 dH.

Behavior

Typically they are aggressive chasers, but will rarely bite or harm other fish. Individual personalities vary greatly—some are calm, while others are rather aggressive towards tank mates. They are bottom dwellers and like lots of dark hiding places. They get along with gourami, barbs, D
danio, catfish but they do well with other sharks when they're young.

When two redtails cohabitate, they have been known to become territorial with each other as they mature. One shark will become dominant and will continually chase and harass the submissive shark. Larger groups of five or more, surprisingly, tend to get along much better than two or three, as they will establish a stable hierarchy; such a group will require a very large heavily planted aquarium, however.

Redtail sharks are considered compatible in some community tanks when young but when mature they may chase docile or peaceful fish who present a large target (such as the Metynnis argenteus, or "silver dollar" fish); similar sharks can be chased but sometimes resulting in no physical damage. r
Redtails do not typically bite or injure other fish, but will chase them. They will mostly chase fish away from their territory and then retreat; therefore, it is important to ensure the aquarium is large enough to allow the redtail some space to call its territory. Aquariums should be at least 170 litres (45 gallons) when a red tail shark is mature but when young probably a 10-20 gallon aquarium or larger for a comfortable community. Redtails are bottom dwellers. Despite this, it is often reported that they do not generally harass loaches, such as Chromobotia macracanthus, and may even exhibit schooling behavior with them.

Size

Footnotes

References
 

red-tailed black shark
Fish of Thailand
Endemic fauna of Thailand
Taxa named by Hugh McCormick Smith
red-tailed black shark